Matt Walsh (born June 18, 1986) is an American right-wing political commentator and author. He is the host of The Matt Walsh Show podcast and is a columnist for The Daily Wire. Walsh has authored four books and starred in The Daily Wire online documentary film What Is a Woman?.

Walsh is a former talk radio host for stations in Delaware and Kentucky. He is outspoken against the LGBT movement, especially the transgender community, and has campaigned against people and hospitals providing transgender health care to adults or to minors.

Career
Walsh did not attend college. He began his career as a talk radio co-host of The Matt and Crank Program at WZBH 93.5 FM in Georgetown, Delaware, from early 2010 to August 1, 2011, and then moved to Rehoboth Beach, Delaware, with WGMD 92.7 FM later that month, where he worked for less than a year. In 2012, he moved to Lexington, Kentucky, joining NewsRadio 630 WLAP and launching a website, The Matt Walsh Blog, in which he discussed various issues from a conservative view. Walsh announced in December 2013 that he was "leaving radio forever" to focus on blogging after his show was canceled. He worked for TheBlaze starting in October 2014. He was also a contributor to HuffPost and began writing for The Daily Wire in October 2017. He has appeared on Tucker Carlson Tonight, The Ingraham Angle, Fox and Friends, Dr. Phil, as well as the podcast The Joe Rogan Experience.

Walsh has authored four books: The Unholy Trinity: Blocking the Left's Assault on Life, Marriage, and Gender (2017), Church of Cowards: A Wake-Up Call to Complacent Christians (2020), Johnny the Walrus (2022), and What Is a Woman?: One Man's Journey to Answer the Question of a Generation (2022).

Walsh has hosted The Matt Walsh Show starting in April 2018 on weekdays; it is about an hour in length.

Views and controversies
Walsh has been described as right-wing, conservative, and far-right. His commentary is sometimes described by media outlets as trolling. He labels himself a "theocratic fascist" in his Twitter biography, which he said was in response to an opponent using the label as an insult.

Walsh has argued that the trial of Kenosha unrest shooter Kyle Rittenhouse, who was acquitted, was malicious prosecution. He has argued for restricting pornography and supports criminalizing abortion. Walsh argued that ozone depletion and acid rain were never serious problems, in tweets that Ars Technica described as "willfully ignoring some very well-documented history".

Regarding the casting of Halle Bailey in the live-action version of The Little Mermaid (2023), Walsh said on The Daily Wire, "from a scientific perspective, it doesn't make a lot of sense to have someone with darker skin who lives deep in the ocean", and suggested the mermaid should be translucent. Walsh's commentary was mocked on CNN by digital senior entertainment writer Lisa France, who said "racism is real, unfortunately, and people get so offended". Later, Walsh said that "Translucent rights are human rights". He called anime "satanic" in an answer to viewers' questions in one of his videos, adding "I have no argument for why it's satanic. It just seems that way to me." He has called multiculturalism a "failed experiment".

Teenage pregnancy 
In 2022, left-leaning media watchdog group Media Matters for America uncovered audio recordings from the 2010s that contained Walsh discussing teenage pregnancy on the radio show The Matt and Crank Program, saying that "the problem is not, per se, teenage pregnancy—it's unwed pregnancy", that "Girls between the ages of like 17 and 24 is when they're technically most fertile", and that society had only recently deemed being a teenager "too young to start a family". After receiving criticism for these comments, Walsh defended his monologue, arguing that he was trying to communicate an uncontroversial historical observation, that because "people married young and stayed married" teenage pregnancy wasn't considered an issue. He further argued that pregnancy out of wedlock is the core issue since it leaves the child "without a stable family structure in place to care for [them]." Walsh then declined to apologize, saying that "no-one gets canceled unless they consent to it, and they willingly play their assigned roles. Well, I do not consent, and I'm not going to play the game". LGBTQ Nation accused Walsh of hypocrisy for defending teenage pregnancies while opposing transgender teenagers.

LGBT issues 
Walsh is an outspoken opponent of the LGBT movement, specifically the transgender community.

In June 2015, Walsh condemned the U.S. Supreme Court case Obergefell v. Hodges, which ruled that the U.S. Constitution guaranteed the right to marriage for same-sex couples, arguing that "a union between two homosexuals is not, never has been, and never will be a legitimate marriage", while insinuating that the ruling will set marriage to become "an institution populated by all forms of depravity and corruption".

In February 2021, after a Gallup poll showed a sharp increase of people who identify as LGBT, especially bisexual and transgender, in Generation Z compared to previous generations, Walsh accused "the media, Hollywood, and the school system" of recruiting children into the LGBT community. Other commentators quoted by PinkNews argued that Walsh was wrong, attributing the increase to different factors, including an easing of social stigmas among younger people.

Shortly after the Russian invasion of Ukraine began on February 24, 2022, Walsh accused President Joe Biden of feminizing the U.S. military and recruiting lesbians who he said "can't do three pushups", and said that it was "not a coincidence that [Russia's invasion] happened after Biden spent his first year in office focusing primarily on wokeness".

The New York Times columnist Michelle Goldberg wrote that Walsh's commentary, as well as that of other right-wing commentators, have caused an increase of anti-LGBT violence and sentiment in the United States. The Southern Poverty Law Center (SPLC) described Walsh as one of the "peddlers of fear and disinformation about LGBTQ people" in the wake of the Club Q mass shooting in November 2022. Walsh had previously said opposing all-age drag events was like fighting cancer, and "just like cancer, stopping it is not a gentle or a painless process".  Following the shooting, Walsh lambasted critics of his rhetoric as "soulless demons" and "evil to the core", accusing them of using the shooting to "blackmail us into accepting the castration and sexualization of children". He also rhetorically asked those on the left who felt that "the drag queen-child combination" would lead to "violent backlash" from right-wingers, "if it's causing this much chaos and violence, why do you insist on continuing to do it?". Jeet Heer from The Nation described Walsh's comments, along with those of a few other right-wing figures, as "implicitly a threat. The right is trying to create a new lynching culture, with LGBTQ people as the target."

Transgender issues

Walsh has repeatedly opposed the transgender community, notably with his children's book Johnny the Walrus, his documentary What Is a Woman?, and campaigns involving hospitals and schools. Walsh and his campaigns are sometimes described as anti-trans and transphobic. Progressive magazine The New Republic named Walsh "Transphobe of the Year" in 2022, saying he "has made a name for himself by demonizing medical professionals and pushing conspiracy theories about 'grooming' and pedophilia in the LGBTQ community". Walsh has referred to being transgender as a "delusion" and a "mental illness", and has compared giving hormone treatments and gender reassignment surgery for transgender youth to child molestation and rape. In May 2021, Walsh called doctors who perform gender-reassignment surgeries for transgender youth "Nazi scientist-evil", "pedophiles", and "plastic surgeons basically acting like Leatherface from The Texas Chain Saw Massacre". Walsh's views are in opposition to the stance of leading American medical groups, which have established guidelines to treat transgender youth; those groups and some research say that denying such care can lead to higher rates of suicide and other mental health issues.

Walsh rented an apartment in Virginia for one day in 2021 to qualify to speak out against the Loudoun County School Board for allowing transgender students the use of restrooms matching their gender identity. During his speech, which he later featured in his film What is a Woman?, Walsh said: "You are all child abusers. You prey upon impressionable children and indoctrinate them into your insane ideological cult, a cult which holds many fanatical views but none so deranged as the idea that boys are girls and girls are boys."

In January 2022, Twitter suspended Walsh's account for 12 hours for tweets it deemed as hateful content against transgender people. In October 2022, after business magnate Elon Musk acquired Twitter, Inc., Walsh encouraged his followers to misgender transgender people, writing that "we have made huge strides against the trans agenda", and that the acquisition, which he called "the liberation of Twitter", will allow them to "ramp up our efforts even more".

In November 2022, Walsh was challenged as a guest on the podcast The Joe Rogan Experience for suggesting that "maybe millions of kids" had been put onto puberty blockers. Producer Jamie Vernon interjected and stated that only 4,780 children had been put on puberty blockers within the past five years. Walsh lowered his guess to "hundreds of thousands" and said he "could be wrong," adding, "who are you gonna trust when they're telling you the numbers?"

Johnny the Walrus

On March 29, 2022, DW Books published Walsh's children's book Johnny the Walrus, which compares being trans to identifying as a walrus.

LGBTQ Nation denounced the book, calling it "anti-transgender" and a mockery of transgender youth, while PinkNews referred to it as "hateful" and "transphobic." Fox News host Tucker Carlson called the book "hilarious". Conservative news website TheBlaze called the book "an effort to push back against radical gender ideology which defies biological reality". The satirist Andrew Doyle, writing in UnHerd, praised the book for mocking the "indoctrination of the young". It was listed as the bestselling LGBT+ book on Amazon in December 2021 before Amazon recategorized it to Political and Social Commentary. Walsh called the recategorization "an unconscionable attack on gay rights and a horrific example of homophobia and gay erasure". Target removed the book from its online bookstore on the same day.

What Is a Woman?

Walsh's online documentary film What is a Woman?, released by The Daily Wire on June 1, 2022, at the beginning of Pride Month, featured Walsh asking the question "what is a woman?" to various people, and arguing for his own views. Walsh had asked the same question in other appearances, including a Dr. Phil show on January 19, 2022, with transgender and non-binary people. On June 14, Walsh published a book based on the documentary, entitled What is a Woman?: One Man's Journey to Answer the Question of a Generation through DW Books.

The documentary received a divided reception from critics and political commentators. Among those who praised it were Karol Markowicz of the New York Post, who commended the documentary for "expos[ing] the lunacy of pro-trans extremism." Detractors, such as AJ Erkert of Science-Based Medicine and Erin Rook of LGBTQ Nation, denounced the film as "propaganda," "transphobic lies," and "science denying." Erkert compared the documentary to the antiscience films Vaxxed and Expelled.

Eventbrite banned screenings of the documentary due to the service not permitting content that promotes "hate, violence, or harassment towards others and/or oneself". Walsh denied that the documentary was hate speech and criticized Eventbrite for permitting the screening of drag shows that allow children in attendance.

In February 2022, Eli Erlick, a transgender activist, alleged that Walsh had invited dozens of people to participate in the documentary under false pretenses. Kataluna Enriquez, Fallon Fox, and other transgender public figures corroborated the account. Walsh created a group called the Gender Unity Project, which the activists said attempted to lure them into participating in the film. The Gender Unity Project's Twitter account and website were taken down shortly after the allegations went public. Erlick claimed there were at least 50 other recruited interviewees, including a 14-year-old transgender girl.

As a part of Walsh's What is a Woman? college tour, he screened the documentary at University of Houston on October 13, 2022, by invitation from Young Conservatives of Texas. While 435 people attended, police estimated 400 protesters—including trans rights activists—as well as counter-protesters outside. A screening by Walsh at the University of Wisconsin, sponsored mostly by Young America's Foundation, was also met by protesters.

Campaign against Eli Erlick

In August 2022, Walsh accused transgender activist Eli Erlick of being a "confessed drug dealer" targeting children because of a deleted Instagram post in which she proposed sending surplus hormone therapy prescriptions—including hundreds of doses of testosterone, estradiol, and spironolactone—to transgender youth for free within states attempting to criminalize transgender health care for minors. Walsh reported her to the University of California, Santa Cruz, where she was a PhD candidate. When the university did not respond to Walsh's report within a day, he said it was "time to escalate" and shared the contact information of various leaders of the university, while threatening to further escalate to the Board of Trustees, the university's donors, and to organize a protest on campus if the university continued to not respond. The university said  it "strongly supports transgender members of our community" and "takes allegations of illegal activity seriously, harassment included". Some conservative commentators reported Erlick to the U.S. Drug Enforcement Administration. Erlick never faced investigation.

Following Walsh's statements Erlick reported harassment on social media, including messages with anti-LGBT slurs and threats of physical violence. Erlick accused Walsh of "profiting from the moral panic over transness", "attacking free speech itself", and stochastic terrorism, which is incitement of violence against a target through mass media with plausible deniability. Walsh denied that his actions constituted stochastic terrorism and argued that sharing public contact information is not harassment.

Campaigns against hospitals providing transgender health care

In 2022, Walsh campaigned against hospitals providing transgender health care for youth. Boston Children's Hospital, one of the hospitals denounced by Walsh and other right-wing figures, reported harassment, death threats, and a hoax bomb threat in August 2022 that led to a woman's arrest in September.

In September 2022, Walsh made accusations against another hospital, Vanderbilt University Medical Center (VUMC), and its transgender clinic in Nashville, Tennessee. The New Republic described accusations by Walsh as "cherry-picking informational content" and noted that Walsh had singled out doctors by name. Walsh said on his show that VUMC doctors "castrate" and "drug and mutilate" children. He said on Twitter that VUMC considered transgender health care a "money-maker", that it threatened "consequences" for medical staff who declined to provide care, and that it tried to "enforce compliance" from hesitant parents of transgender youth. Walsh criticized VUMC's "trans buddies" program and called its patient advocates "trans activists". Tennessee Governor Bill Lee and other Republicans in the state called for an investigation into the hospital. Walsh tweeted about meeting with Tennessee lawmakers on a bill to shut down the clinic. VUMC reported harassment and threats against its staff, and there were calls for murders and arrests of VUMC doctors in far-right groups on Reddit and 4chan. Vanderbilt took down its webpage about the clinic and said that Walsh had "misrepresent[ed] facts about the care" it provides. On October 7, 2022, VUMC announced that it would pause gender-affirming surgeries for minors and review its practices. Since 2018, VUMC provided an average of five such surgeries to minors annually. All patients were over 16-years-old and obtained parental consent. None have received genital surgery.

Walsh spoke at a Nashville rally organized by The Daily Wire called "The Rally to End Child Mutilation" on October 21, 2022, in opposition to transgender health care for minors. The rally, whose headline speakers included Tennessee Republican state senator Jack Johnson  and representative William Lamberth, United States Senator 
Marsha Blackburn, and former United States Congresswoman Tulsi Gabbard, drew between 1,500 and 3,000 people, including supporters and protesters.

Politicians
After South Dakota Governor Kristi Noem permitted businesses to require a COVID-19 vaccine for their employees, Walsh criticized her by writing that she was only considered a frontrunner for the 2024 United States presidential election because of her physical attractiveness. After Noem called his comment misogynistic, Walsh said he had no regrets but would "accept apologies from all of the performative idiots pretending to be offended by it".

When U.S. representative Alexandria Ocasio-Cortez tweeted photos of her grandmother's house in Puerto Rico that was unrepaired in 2021, four years after Hurricane Maria, and blamed former President Donald Trump for not doing enough to help the recovery, Walsh criticized Ocasio-Cortez for not providing the money herself. He launched a crowdfunding effort to pay for the repairs and raised $100,000 in the first 24 hours, but the grandmother's family refused the funds and GoFundMe shut the effort down. Ocasio-Cortez responded to the criticism by saying, "My abuela is okay ... but instead of only caring for mine & letting others suffer, I'm calling attention to the systemic injustices you seem totally fine w/ in having a US colony."

Walsh criticized Donald Trump in November 2022 for nicknaming Republican Florida governor Ron DeSantis "Ron DeSanctimonious" ahead of the November 2022 midterm elections.

Catholic Church event cancellation
St. Francis Xavier College Church, at Saint Louis University, canceled a speech by Walsh that it had planned to co-host with Young Americans for Freedom in December 2021. The church said it had decided that Walsh's "provocative positions on immigration, on communities of color, on Muslims, and on members of the LGBTQ community" were "in contradiction to Jesus' great commandment to love God and love our neighbor". Walsh spoke at a different St. Louis venue.

Personal life

Walsh lives in Nashville, Tennessee and is married to Alissa Ann Walsh. They met on eHarmony. They have six children, including two sets of twins. Alissa has also had seven miscarriages.

Walsh is a practicing Catholic.

Books
 The Unholy Trinity: Blocking the Left's Assault on Life, Marriage, and Gender. New York: Crown Publishing Group (2017). .
 Church of Cowards: A Wake-Up Call to Complacent Christians. Washington, DC: Regnery Gateway (2020). . .
 Johnny the Walrus. Illustrations by K. Reece. Nashville, TN: DW Books (2022). .
 What is a Woman?: One Man's Journey to Answer the Question of a Generation. Nashville, TN: DW Books (2022). . .

See also
 Transgender rights in the United States
 Transphobia in the United States
 Anti-gender movement

References

External links

 
 
 
 Matt Walsh on YouTube

Living people
1986 births
American anti-abortion activists
American children's writers
American columnists
American male non-fiction writers
American nationalists
American people of Irish descent
American podcasters
American political commentators
American political writers
American Roman Catholics
American talk radio hosts
Anti-LGBT sentiment
Internet trolls
Conservatism in the United States
Male critics of feminism
The Daily Wire people
Critics of multiculturalism
American anti-same-sex-marriage activists